Chorizandra multiarticulata is a sedge of the family Cyperaceae that is native to Australia.

The plant blooms between August and September producing purple-brown flowers.

In Western Australia it is found in swampy areas along the coast of the Wheatbelt and Goldfields-Esperance regions where it grows in sandy-clay soils.

References

Plants described in 1841
Flora of Western Australia
multiarticulata